Eufidonia convergaria, the pine powder moth or converged powder moth, is a species of moth of the  family Geometridae. It is found from Newfoundland to British Columbia and the northwestern parts of the United States.

The wingspan is 22–30 mm. The moth flies from May to July depending on the location.

The larvae feed on Pinus species, including white pine, lodgepole pine, and jack pine.

External links
Larval Stage info

Melanolophiini